The 1928 Villanova Wildcats football team represented the Villanova University during the 1928 college football season. The head coach was Harry Stuhldreher, coaching his fourth season with the Wildcats. The team played their home games at Villanova Stadium in Villanova, Pennsylvania.

Schedule

References

Villanova
Villanova Wildcats football seasons
College football undefeated seasons
Villanova Wildcats football